Hye may refer to:

People
 Hye (Korean name), a given name
 Abdur Rahman Hye (1919–2008), Pakistani architect
 Hasnat Abdul Hye (born 1939), Bangladeshi writer

Other uses
Hye, Texas, United States
 Armenian language (ISO 639-2 code: hye)